Mahend (also known as Nasrabad) is a village of in Mohammdabad of Ghazipur in the Indian state of Uttar Pradesh.

References 

Dildarnagar Fatehpur
Towns and villages in Kamsar
Villages in Ghazipur district